Dehydroaltenusin is an inhibitor of mammalian DNA polymerase α. It has been isolated from the fungus Alternaria tenuis.

References

Polyphenols
Lactones